Melanie Lasrich (born 23 August 1968) is a German footballer. She played in five matches for the Germany women's national football team from 1985 to 1993.

References

External links
 

1968 births
Living people
German women's footballers
Germany women's international footballers
Place of birth missing (living people)
Women's association footballers not categorized by position